Naravarikuppam is a town in Thiruvallur district in the Indian state of Tamil Nadu.

Geography
It has an average elevation of 13 metres (42 feet).

Demographics
 India census, Red Hills had a population of 18,327. Males constitute 51% of the population and females 49%. Red Hills  has an average literacy rate of 75%, higher than the national average of 59.5%: male literacy is 81%, and female literacy is 69%. In ,Red Hills 12% of the population is under 6 years of age.

References

Cities and towns in Tiruvallur district